F. H. Fyall was a state Representative in the U.S. state of Georgia during the Reconstruction era. He was one of the Original 33 African Americans elected as legislators in Georgia. 

He was owned as a slave earlier in his life. His eligibility to hold elected office in Georgia and that of three other elected representatives debated by the legislature when it kicked out 25 "Negros" deemed ineligible to serve. He represented Macon.

Before the American Civil War he was owned by Osborne Augustus Lochrane.

Further reading
"Negroes in the Georgia Legislature: The Case of F. H. Fyall of Macon County" Georgia Historical Quarterly 44 March 1960, pages 85–97.

References

African-American state legislators in Georgia (U.S. state)
1824 births
Date of death missing
French emigrants to the United States
People from Macon, Georgia